The Men's 10 m synchro platform competition of the 2022 European Aquatics Championships was held on 19 August 2022.

Results

The final was started at 15:30.

References

Diving